The Giro d'Abruzzo was a professional cycling race held annually in Italy. It was part of UCI Europe Tour in category 2.2 in 2007.

Winners

References

Cycle races in Italy
UCI Europe Tour races
Recurring sporting events established in 1961
1961 establishments in Italy
Defunct cycling races in Italy